The Austrian men's national hockey team is the national ice hockey team for Austria. The team is controlled by Österreichischer Eishockeyverband. As of 2022 the Austrian team is ranked 18th in the IIHF World Rankings. Austria has not won a medal in a major tournament since 1947, and has not broken 10th place since 1994. Austria currently has 8,799 registered players (0.1% of the total population).

Tournament record

Olympic Games

World Championship

1930 – Finished in 4th place
1931 – Won bronze medal
1933 – Finished in 4th place
1934 – Finished in 7th place
1935 – Finished in 6th place
1938 – Finished tied in 10th place
1947 – Won bronze medal
1949 – Finished in 6th place
1951 – Finished in 11th place (4th in Pool B)
1952 – Finished in 11th place (2nd in Pool B)
1953 – Finished in 6th place (3rd in Pool B)
1955 – Finished in 11th place (2nd in Pool B)
1957 – Finished in 7th place
1959 – Finished in 15th place (3rd in Pool B)
1961 – Finished in 14th place (6th in Pool B)
1962 – Finished in 10th place (2nd in Pool B)
1963 – Finished in 16th place (won Pool C)
1965 – Finished in 13th place (5th in Pool B)
1966 – Finished in 13th place (5th in Pool B)
1967 – Finished in 14th place (6th in Pool B)
1969 – Finished in 13th place (7th in Pool B)
1970 – Finished in 15th place (won Pool C)
1971 – Finished in 13th place (7th in Pool B)
1972 – Finished in 14th place (won Pool C)
1973 – Finished in 12th place (6th in Pool B)
1974 – Finished in 14th place (8th in Pool B)
1975 – Finished in 17th place (3rd in Pool C)
1976 – Finished in 17th place (won Pool C)
1977 – Finished in 17th place (9th in Pool B)
1978 – Finished in 18th place (2nd in Pool C)
1979 – Finished in 15th place (7th in Pool B)
1981 – Finished in 17th place (won Pool C)
1982 – Finished in 10th place (2nd in Pool B)
1983 – Finished in 11th place (3rd in Pool B)
1985 – Finished in 12th place (4th in Pool B)
1986 – Finished in 14th place (6th in Pool B)
1987 – Finished in 11th place (3rd in Pool B)
1989 – Finished in 14th place (6th in Pool B)
1990 – Finished in 11th place (3rd in Pool B)
1991 – Finished in 13th place (5th in Pool B)
1992 – Finished in 13th place (won Pool B)
1993 – Finished in 11th place
1994 – Finished in 8th place
1995 – Finished in 11th place
1996 – Finished in 12th place
1997 – Finished in 16th place (4th in Pool B)

European Championship

1912 Championship was later annulled because Austria was not a member of the IIHF at the time of the competition.

Team

Current roster
Roster for the 2022 IIHF World Championship.

Head coach: Roger Bader

Notable players

Uniform evolution

References

External links

IIHF profile
National Teams of Ice Hockey

 
 
National ice hockey teams in Europe